The 1985 sex comedy Cavegirl was written and directed by David Oliver and starring Daniel Roebuck, Cynthia Thompson, and Stacey Q in her film debut.

Plot

The film tells the story of a clumsy high school boy named Rex (Daniel Roebuck) who gets lost in a cave while on a class excursion. A crystal opens a time portal and sends him back in time to caveman times. There he meets "smokin' hot" Eba (Cynthia Thompson). The antics follow as Rex tries to get Eba to sleep with him.

Cast
 Daniel Roebuck as Rex
 Cynthia Thompson as Eba (as Cindy Ann Thompson)
 Darren Young as Dar
 Saba Moor-Doucette as Saba (as Saba Moor)
 Jeff Chayette as Argh
 Charles Mitchell as Char
 Cynthia Rullo as Aka
 Tom Hamill as Casey
 Bill Adams as Bill
 Chris Noble as Hank
 Bill Sehres as Ralph
 Syndi King as Karen
 A.A. Cavallaro as Rex's Father
 Maggie Ostroff as Rex's Mother
 Stacey Q as Brenda (as Stacey Swain)

References

1985 films
1985 comedy films
1980s teen comedy films
1980s sex comedy films
American teen comedy films
Crown International Pictures films
Films about time travel
Teen sex comedy films
Films about cavemen
1980s American films